is a Japanese women's professional shogi player ranked 4-dan. She is a former Women's  title holder.

Women's shogi professional

Promotion history
Ueda's promotion history is as follows.
 2-kyū: April 1, 2001
 1-kyū: April 1, 2002
 1-dan: April 1, 2003
 2-dan: June 30, 2008
 3-dan: May 10, 2011
 4-dan: May 21, 2018

Note: All ranks are women's professional ranks.

Titles and other championships
Ueda has appeared in major title matches nine times and has won a total of two titles: she won the Women's  title in 2011 and 2012. In addition to major titles, Ueda has won one other shogi championships: the 6th  in 2012.

Awards and honors
Ueda has received a number of Japan Shogi Association Annual Shogi Awards: "Women's Professional Most Games Played" (2009); "Women's Professional Award" and "Game of the Year Special Prize" (2012); "Women's Professional Award" and "Game of the Year Special Prize" (2016); and "Game of the Year Special Prize" (2018).

Personal life
Ueda is married to shogi professional Takuma Oikawa. The couple were married in June 2013 and have two daughters .

References

External links
 ShogiHub: Ueda, Hatsumi
 blog: ブログだよ
 

Japanese shogi players
Living people
Women's professional shogi players
Queen (shogi)
1988 births
People from Kodaira, Tokyo
Professional shogi players from Tokyo Metropolis